Martin Jean Wasinski (born 7 April 2004) is a Belgian professional footballer who plays as a midfielder for Belgian Pro League club Kortrijk on loan from Charleroi.

Club career
Having joined Charleroi at under-15 level, he progressed through the club's youth ranks, making his professional debut in the 2–2 Belgian First Division A draw with Zulte Waregem on 22 August 2021, aged 17. Used in a variety of positions across defence and midfield, and having to split his time between football and school, Wasinski made 15 league appearances during the 2021–22 season.

In August 2022, Wasinski extended his contract with Charleroi until summer 2025.

On 6 January 2023, Wasinski was loaned by Kortrijk until the end of the 2022–23 season.

International career
Born in Belgium, Wasinski is of Polish descent. He was called up to the Belgian under-16 team in November 2019 for a youth tournament in Paraguay. He has also represented Belgium at under-18, under-19 and under-20 levels.

References

2004 births
Belgian people of Polish descent
Living people
Belgian footballers
Belgium youth international footballers
Association football midfielders
R. Charleroi S.C. players
K.V. Kortrijk players
Belgian Pro League players